John Wilderson House is a historic home located at Garrett, DeKalb County, Indiana.  It was built about 1909, and is a two-story, "L"-shaped, Colonial Revival-style frame dwelling. It features a wraparound porch on a cast stone base and supported by unfluted Tuscan order columns.

It was added to the National Register of Historic Places in 1983.

References

Houses on the National Register of Historic Places in Indiana
Colonial Revival architecture in Indiana
Houses completed in 1909
Houses in DeKalb County, Indiana
National Register of Historic Places in DeKalb County, Indiana